The 2000 Open Championship was a men's major golf championship and the 129th Open Championship, held from 20 to 23 July at the Old Course in St Andrews, Scotland. Tiger Woods, 24, won his first Open Championship and fourth major title, eight strokes ahead of runners-up Thomas Bjørn and Ernie Els.

With the victory, Woods became the fifth golfer and also youngest ever to complete a career Grand Slam (winning the Open Championship, PGA Championship, Masters and U.S. Open in the course of a career), beating Jack Nicklaus' record by two years.
He went on to complete the "Tiger Slam" – holding all four major championships simultaneously, as this Open Championship was preceded by the 2000 U.S. Open at Pebble Beach Golf Links and then followed by the 2000 PGA Championship at Valhalla Golf Club and the 2001 Masters at Augusta National Golf Club.

At this Open, Woods also achieved the lowest 72-hole score in relation to par at −19, which was a record for all major championships for fifteen years, until Jason Day broke it at the PGA Championship in 2015 at twenty-under-par.

Woods became the sixth to win the U.S. Open and the Open Championship in the same year, joining fellow Americans Bobby Jones (1926, 1930), Gene Sarazen (1932), Ben Hogan (1953), Lee Trevino (1971), and Tom Watson (1982). Woods also became the second player after Nicklaus to win both an Open Championship at St Andrews and a U.S. Open at Pebble Beach.

It was the first Open Championship to be telecast in high-definition television in any country, being telecast in the United States by ABC Sports that year.

Course

Previous lengths of the course for The Open Championship (since 1950):
  - 1995, 1990, 1984, 1978
  - 1970 
  - 1964, 1960, 1955

Past champions in the field

Made the cut

Missed the cut

Round summaries

First round
Thursday, 20 July 2000

Second round
Friday, 21 July 2000

Amateurs: Ilonen (+1), Donald (+4), Rowe (+4), Gossett (+5).

Third round
Saturday, 22 July 2000

Final round
Sunday, 23 July 2000

Source:

Scorecard

Cumulative tournament scores, relative to par

Source:

References

External links
St Andrews 2000 (Official site)
129th Open Championship - St Andrews (European Tour)
  from the Open Championship (produced by Trans World Sport)

The Open Championship
Golf tournaments in Scotland
Sport in Fife
Open Championship
Open Championship
Open Championship